Mohammad-Bagher Bagheri Kani born in 1926, is an Iranian Shia Mujtahid. He was one of 82-86 Mujtahids to be elected in the First, Second, and Fourth terms in the Assembly of Experts.

Life and Education 
Mohammad Bagher was born in 1926, in Kan Tehran. He is the father of Ali Bagheri and older brother of Mohammad-Reza Mahdavi Kani. He was taught Islamic jurisprudence and Interpretation of Quran under Ruhollah Khomeini, Hossein Borujerdi, Muhammad Husayn Tabatabai, and Mohammad-Reza Golpaygani while attending his Islamic Studies in Qom Seminary. He was also the head of Imam Sadiq University from December 2014 to September 2015.

See also

 List of Ayatollahs
 List of members in the Fifth Term of the Council of Experts

References

External links

20th-century Iranian politicians
Living people
Place of birth missing (living people)
1926 births
Iranian ayatollahs